The 4th Boat Race took place on the River Thames on 15 April 1840.  It was the third of the University Boat Races to be held on the Thames, between Westminster Bridge and Putney Bridge.  Oxford University Boat Club was formed to assist in the selection of the Oxford crew. Nevertheless, Cambridge won the race by three-quarters of a length to lead the overall record at 3–1.

Background

The Boat Race is a side-by-side rowing competition between the University of Oxford (sometimes referred to as the "Dark Blues") and the University of Cambridge (sometimes referred to as the "Light Blues").  The race was first held in 1829, and takes place on the River Thames in southwest London.

Following heavy defeats in the 1836 and 1839 races, and in order to improve the selection of the crew, Oxford University Boat Club was formed on 23 April 1839, to which anyone at the university could subscribe and which was governed by the various college boat club captains.  The initial letter of challenge was delivered to Cambridge from Oxford in February.  After considerable discussion, mainly about the restriction of crew selection to undergraduates only, the date of the race, 15 April 1840, was agreed sixteen days prior to the race itself.  The umpires for the race were Calverley Bewicke (for Oxford) and Charles Jasper Selwyn (for Cambridge), while W. H. Harrison, the Commodore of the Royal Thames Yacht Club, was the referee.  The race was to take place on a five-and-three-quarter-mile (9.2 km) stretch of the Thames between Westminster Bridge and Putney Bridge.

Crews
The Oxford crew weighed an average of 11 st 10.5 lb (74.4 kg) per rower,  more per man than their opponents.  Cambridge saw former Blues Alfred Shadwell and cox Thomas Selby Egan return, while Oxford's crew also contained two veterans of the race, in Samuel Maberly and R. G. Walls.

Race 

Oxford won the toss and elected to start from the Middlesex side of the river, handing the Surrey side to Cambridge.  The race commenced from below Westminster Bridge at 1.30 p.m., with Edward Searle acting as the starter.  With a number of steamers blocking the route, Oxford made a good start and took an early lead.  The wake of the steamers caused rough water in which both crews struggled to maintain a consistent rhythm.  The lead had extended by the time the crews passed below Vauxhall Bridge and was nearly three lengths by the Spread Eagle pub.  At this point Cambridge began to reduce the deficit, but following a warning from Robert Coombes who was steering the umpire's boat Dolphin, Oxford's cox Garnett steered across the path of Cambridge.  The Light Blues maintained their course and Oxford were forced back again.  By the Red House, Cambridge had restored parity and started to pull away.  Despite suffering further rough water from the wake of another steamer at Battersea Bridge, Cambridge maintained their lead and passed through the centre arch of Putney Bridge three-quarters of a length ahead of Oxford.  The winning time was 29 minutes 3 seconds, and the victory took the overall lead to 3–1 in favour of Cambridge.

References
Notes

Bibliography

External links
 Official website

1840 in sports
The Boat Race